Francs Peak, elevation , is the highest point in the Absaroka Range which extends from north-central Wyoming into south-central Montana, in the United States. It is in the Washakie Wilderness of Shoshone National Forest, and the peak is also the highest point in Park County, Wyoming, which includes much of Yellowstone National Park. It was named after Otto Franc, a cattle baron and homesteader in the Big Horn Basin.

See also
 4000 meter peaks of North America
 Central Rocky Mountains
 Mountain peaks of North America
 Mountain peaks of the Rocky Mountains
 Mountain peaks of the United States

References

External links

Shoshone National Forest
Mountains of Wyoming
Mountains of Park County, Wyoming
North American 4000 m summits